Abdullah bin Tarmugi (Jawi: عبدالله بن ترموڬي; born 25 August 1944) is a Singaporean former politician who served as Speaker of the Parliament of Singapore between 2002 and 2011.

Early life
Born to a Javanese father and a Chinese mother, Abdullah's father was a low-salaried surveyor's assistant and his grandfather ran a provision shop.

Abdullah studied at Raffles Institution and obtained a Bachelor of Social Sciences from the University of Singapore, followed by a post-graduate diploma in urban studies from the University of London in 1972 under a Commonwealth Scholarship.

Political career
Abdullah was a Member of Parliament from 1984 to 2011, starting out at Siglap constituency and later Bedok Group Representation Constituency (Bedok GRC) from 1991 to 1996. After Bedok GRC and Eunos GRC was merged to form East Coast GRC in 1997, Abdullah still remained in the Siglap ward but under East Coast GRC.  Abdullah was the Minister for Community Development (subsequently the Minister of Community Development and Sports) and the Minister-in-charge of Muslim Affairs from 1994 to 2002 and 2000 to 2002 respectively. Abdullah was also the Deputy Speaker of Parliament from 1989 to 1993 before becoming the Speaker of Parliament on 25 March 2002. He declined to contest the Singapore Presidential Elections in 2017.

Abdullah announced his retirement from politics on 24 March 2011, prior to the 2011 general elections. In January 2012, Abdullah was appointed to the Presidential Council for Minority Rights by Singapore President Tony Tan and a permanent member by President Halimah Yacob.

References

1944 births
Living people
Members of the Parliament of Singapore
National University of Singapore alumni
Alumni of the University of London
People's Action Party politicians
Raffles Institution alumni
Singaporean Muslims
Singaporean people of Chinese descent
Singaporean people of Javanese descent
Singaporean people of Malay descent
Speakers of the Parliament of Singapore